Varniai (Samogitian: Varnē) is a  city in the Telšiai County, western Lithuania. In the Middle Ages the city was known as Medininkai (Samogitian: Medėninkā).

It was established in the 14th century, on the bank of the Varnelė River, near an important Samogitian castle. It was the center of Samogitian Catholic church: after the baptism of Samogitia, the Samogitian Bishop resided in the town. Around 1414–1416 the first church was built, and c. 1464 the first cathedral.

Varniai was the center of Samogitian episcopate until the middle of the 19th century, when authorities of the Russian Empire moved it to Kaunas.

With support of Merkelis Giedraitis, Mikalojus Daukša translated and made ready for publication Katechizmas, the first Lithuanian language book printed in the Grand Duchy of Lithuania, then part of the Polish–Lithuanian Commonwealth.

It was also residence of Motiejus Valančius.

Gallery

Notable residents
Boris Schatz
 Merkelis Giedraitis
 Mikalojus Daukša
 Motiejus Valančius

External links

 Varniai – A Resourceful Renaissance Center of 16th Century Cultural and National Ideology
 Park of Varniai and history of Varniai
 Museum of Samogitian episcopate
 Website of Varniai

Cities in Telšiai County
Cities in Lithuania
Telšiai District Municipality
Telshevsky Uyezd